The Grove Street Playhouse, also known during its existence as the Courtyard Playhouse, was an off-Broadway theatre located on Grove Street in the West Village.

The building dated to 1903 and had a number of uses throughout its history.The Courtyard Players first used the former tile factory as a theatre in 1968 and it grew into a hub for children's theatre when the Little People's Theater Company moved from 45th Street. Subsequently also known as Miss Majesties, it was the oldest children's theatre company in New York City. Prior usage included the Village Arts Company (from 1953) and the Opposite Theater Company in 1958.

It took the name Grove Street Playhouse in 1995 under the artistic director Marilyn Majeski and operated as such until 2002. Notable productions included Private Lives, which featured Noel Coward.

References

Off-Broadway theaters
Children's Theatre companies in New York City